Epuraea populi is a species of sap-feeding beetle in the family Nitidulidae. It is found in North America.

References

Further reading

 

Nitidulidae
Articles created by Qbugbot
Beetles described in 1939